Philibert Audebrand (31 December 1815 - 10 September 1906) was a French writer, journalist, author of medieval chronicles, satirical verses and historical novels. In Mémoires d'un passant (Calmann-Lévy, 1893), he dedicated a tasty portrait to Bernard-François Balssa, Honoré de Balzac's father whom he considers as a prodigious person.

He wrote under two pseudonyms: Alpha and Eugène Duvernay.

Works 
 Fontainebleau, paysages, légendes, souvenirs, fantaisies
 Michel Chevalier 
 Napoléon a-t-il été un homme heureux ?
 A qui sera-t-elle ? histoire de l'autre jour
 Bérengère de Chamblis, histoire d'un château
 Un café de journalistes sous Napoléon III
 César Berthelin, manieur d'argent
 Ceux qui mangent la pomme, racontars parisiens
 Le chevalier noir
 Lauriers et cyprès, pages d'histoire contemporaine
 Leon Gozlan, scènes de la vie littéraire (1828–1865)
 La lettre déchirée
 Les Mariages d'aujourd'hui
 Les mariages manqués
 Les trois nuits de sir Richard Cockerill
 Les violette blanche : conte vrai
 Voyage et aventures autour du monde de Robert Kergorieu
 Les Yeux noirs et les yeux bleus
 Les sacripants de Paris
 Schinderhannes et les bandits du Rhin
 Le Secret de Chamblis, histoire d'un château...
 La Sérénade de don Juan
 Soldats, poètes et tribuns : petits mémoires du XIXe siècle
 Souvenirs de la tribune des journalistes (1848-1852)
 Les Trois Juifs 
 Mémoires d'un passant
 La salamandre d'or... [- Le Dernier chapitre]
 Nos Révolutionnaires, pages d'histoire contemporaine, 1830-1880
 Le Chien de la Chataigneraie 
 La clé d'argent
 Comment on joue un fin renard, scènes de la vie parisienne 
 Derniers jours de la bohème : souvenirs de la vie littéraire
 Les Divorces de Paris, scènes de la vie intime
 La dot volée : scènes de la vie parisienne
 Le Drame de la Sauvagère
 P.-J. Proudhon et l'écuyère de l'Hippodrome, scènes de la vie littéraire
 Le Péché de Son Excellence
 Un petit-fils de Robinson
 Petites Comédies du boudoir
 Petits mémoires d'une stalle d'orchestre : acteurs, actrices, auteurs, journalistes
 Petits mémoires du XIXe siècle
 La Pivardière le bigame
 Romanciers et viveurs du XIXe siècle
 L'Enchanteresse, histoire parisienne
 Une fête sur le feu, scènes de la vie parisienne 
 La Fille de Caïn, scènes de la vie réelle
 Les Fredaines de Jean de Cérilly
 Le Fusil maudit, scènes de la vie de sport 
 Les gasconnades de l'amour : scènes de la vie parisienne
 Histoire intime de la révolution du 18 mars, comité central et Commune 
 Il était une fois... récits et nouvelles de toutes les couleurs...
 Le Paysan de l'Ukraine, épisode de l'insurrection polonaise
 Le Panier de pêches, one-act comédie en vaudevilles, by MM. Henry de Kock and Philibert Audebrand... [Paris, Vaudeville, 1 November 1857.]
 Menus propos, by René de Rovigo and Philibert Audebrand 
 Feuilles volantes, by René de Rovigo and Philibert Audebrand

Bibliography 
 GROZIEUX DE LAGUERENNE, Lise, Journalistes et journaux dans les Mémoires de Philibert Audebrand, Mémoire de D.E.A. en Littérature française under the direction of Mr. Robert Ricatte, Paris, Sorbonne, 1960, 224p.

References

External links 
 Philibert Audebrand on Medias 19
 Philibert Audebrand, Exposition universelle de l'industrie. L'art appliqué à la vie intime, 1856 on "Institut national de l'histoire de l'art"

19th-century French journalists
1815 births
1906 deaths
People from Cher (department)
Burials at Père Lachaise Cemetery